Michelle Schatzman (1949–2010) was a French mathematician, specializing in applied mathematics, who combined research as a CNRS research director and teaching as a professor at the Claude Bernard University Lyon 1.

Biography
Michelle Véra Schatzman was born in a secular Jewish family. Her father was French astrophysicist Évry Schatzman, who also was president of the Rationalist Union. Her mother Ruth Schatzman (née Fisher) was an associate of Russian in high schools in Lille and Paris, then a lecturer at the Paris VIII University.

Michelle Schatzman married Yves Pigier in 1975. They had two children, Claude Mangoubi (née Pigier), born in 1976 in Clamart, and René Pigier, born in 1983 in Paris. They divorced in 1988. Her daughter is married to Dan Mangoubi, an Israeli mathematician, a professor at the Albert Einstein Institute of the University of Jerusalem.

Education and career
Michelle Schatzman entered École normale supérieure de jeunes filles in 1968. She obtained the aggregation and a PhD in 1971, under the leadership of Haïm Brezis and a state doctorate in 1979 under the direction of Jacques Louis Lions.

She was attaché then research assistant from 1972 to 1984 at the Laboratoire d'analyse numérique in Paris 6, now Laboratoire Jacques-Louis Lions, then from spring 1981, at the Center of Applied Mathematics of the École Polytechnique.

She became a professor at the Claude Bernard University Lyon 1 in 1984, in the Lyon-Saint-Étienne digital analysis team, which in 1995 became the Laboratory for Applied Mathematics in Lyon (MAPLY), for eight years.

She returned to the CNRS in 2005 as a research director while continuing to teach, especially master students.

Over the years, she has written more than 70 scientific articles, many of them are still frequently quoted.

Awards
 Knight of the Legion of Honor (2008).
 Prize of M me Claude Berthault awarded by the French Academy of Sciences in 2006.
 A model of the vorticity density of superconductivity vortices proposed in 1996 is called the Chapman-Rubinstein-Schatzman model.

Publications
 Numerical Analysis, A Mathematical Approach, first published by Masson in 1991 and reprinted by Dunod in 2001
 Numerical Analysis: A Mathematical Introduction (2002), Clarendon Press, Oxford. .

References

External links
 
 
 
 
 Confluentes Mathematici: Special issues in memory of Michèle Schatzman

1949 births
2010 deaths
20th-century French mathematicians
Mathematical analysts
French Wikimedians
Research directors of the French National Centre for Scientific Research